Choriogonadotropin subunit beta variant 1 is a protein that in humans is encoded by the CGB1 gene.

The beta subunit of chorionic gonadotropin (CGB) is encoded by six highly homologous and structurally similar genes that are arranged in tandem and inverted pairs on chromosome 19q13.3, and contiguous with the luteinizing hormone beta (LHB) subunit gene. The CGB genes are primarily distinguished by differences in the 5' untranslated region. This gene was originally thought to be one of the two pseudogenes (CGB1 and CGB2) of CGB subunit, however, detection of CGB1 and CGB2 transcripts in vivo, and their presence on the polysomes, suggested that these transcripts are translated. To date, a protein product corresponding to CGB1 has not been isolated. The deduced sequence of the hypothetical protein of 132 aa does not share any similarity with that of functional CGB subunits. However, a 155 aa protein, translated from a different frame, is about the same size, and shares 98% identity with other CGB subunits.

References

Further reading

External links